Paluwas is a village in the Bhiwani district of the Indian state of Haryana. , the village had 1,409 households with a total population of 7,370 of which 3,863 were male and 3,507 female.

References

Villages in Bhiwani district